Fo Guang Shan (FGS) is an international Chinese Mahāyāna Buddhist organization and monastic order based in Taiwan that practices Humanistic Buddhism whose roots are traced to the Linji school of Chan Buddhism. The headquarters, Fo Guang Shan Monastery is located in Dashu District, Kaohsiung, and is the largest Buddhist monastery in Taiwan. The organization is also one of the largest charity organizations in Taiwan. The organization's counterpart for laypeople is known as the Buddha's Light International Association.

Founded in 1967 by Hsing Yun, the order promotes Humanistic Buddhism and is known for its efforts in the modernization of Chinese Buddhism. The order is famous for its use of technology and its temples are often furnished with the latest equipment. Hsing Yun's stated position for Fo Guang Shan is that it is an "amalgam of all Eight Schools of Chinese Buddhism". The Fo Guang Shan order has several associated colleges, among them Fo Guang University in Taiwan and University of the West in the United States, which offers undergraduate and postgraduate degrees in both Buddhist Studies and secular fields.

In Taiwan, Hsing Yun is popularly referred to as one of the "Four Heavenly Kings" and Fo Guang Shan is considered one of the "Four Great Mountains" or four major Buddhist organizations of Taiwanese Buddhism, along with Dharma Drum Mountain, Tzu Chi, and Chung Tai Shan.

History 
In 1967, Hsing Yun purchased more than 30 hectares in Dashu Township, Kaohsiung County as the site for the construction of a monastery. The groundbreaking ceremony was held on 16 May 1967.

Fo Guang Shan has embarked on many construction projects, including university buildings, shrines, rectories, retirement homes, and a cemetery. In 1975, Fo Guang Shan's iconic 36-metre tall statue of Amitābha Buddha was consecrated. In 1981, 15 years after its establishment, the Great Hero Hall was built. During these times, many other Fo Guang Shan temples outside the order's mother monastery were also built. In May 1997, Hsing Yun announced that he would close the mountain gate of Fo Guang Shan to the general public. His reason in closing the monastery was to give monastics the cloistered atmosphere they need for their Buddhist practice. In practice, many Chinese monasteries have also closed their mountain gates to give a cloistered atmosphere to the temple residents. At the end of 2000, then President Chen Shui-bian of the Republic of China (Taiwan) and government officials from Kaohsiung visited Fo Guang Shan, bringing with them the wish from their constituents that Fo Guang Shan reopen its mountain gate. After due consideration, Fo Guang Shan decided to reopen the monastery to some extent, thereby providing the public a place to practice Pure Land Buddhism. On top of its headquarters being the largest monastery in Taiwan, it has a network of over 300 branches throughout Taiwan.

In the 2010s, Fo Guang Shan began establishment in mainland China, focusing more on charity and Chinese cultural revival rather than Buddhist propagation in order to avoid conflict with the Chinese Communist Party (CCP), which opposes organized religion. Fo Guang Shan's presence in China increased under the leadership of CCP general secretary Xi Jinping after he started a program to revive traditional Chinese faiths.

As of 2017, the order had over 1,000 monks and nuns, and over 1 million followers worldwide, with branches in fifty countries.

On 5 February 2023 founder Hsing Yun died at his residence at the age of 95 in Kaoshiung, Taiwan. His funeral is scheduled for 12 February 2023.

Activities 
Temples and organizations have been established in 173 countries throughout the world, and now encompasses more than 3,500 monastics. The organization emphasizes education and service, maintaining universities, Buddhist colleges, libraries, publishing houses, translation centres, Buddhist art galleries, teahouses, and mobile medical clinics. It has also established a children's room, retirement home, high school and television station.

Social and medical programs 
The social and medical programs of Fo Guang Shan include a free medical clinic with mobile units that serve remote villages, an annual winter relief program organized to distribute warm clothing and food supplies to the needy, a children's and seniors' home, wildlife conservation areas to protect living creatures, and a cemetery for the care of the deceased. Fo Guang Shan's social work focuses primarily on helping the poor in remote areas.

The organization also runs orphanages, homes for the elderly, and drug rehabilitation programs in prisons. Fo Guang Shan has also been involved in some international relief efforts.

Educational programs 
The educational programs of Fo Guang Shan include four Buddhist colleges, three regular colleges, and various community colleges. The Fo Guang University was established in 2000. It focuses mainly on the humanities and social sciences. The Chinese Buddhist research institute is subdivided into four separate departments; a women's and men's college, and an international and English Buddhist studies department. Tuition fees and lodging are provided by Fo Guang Shan, free of charge. Other prominent universities the order has established include Nanhua University in Taiwan and the University of the West in the United States.

The organization also operates Pu-Men High School in Taipei, Jiun Tou Elementary and Junior High School, Humanities Primary and Junior High School, which provides regular curriculum for students. Fo Guang Shan also has nursery schools, kindergartens, and Sunday schools for children.

Along with Tzu Chi, Fo Guang Shan is the only major Buddhist organization in Taiwan that offers some form of strictly secular education, as opposed to purely religious.

In mainland China, Fo Guang Shan operates numerous cultural education programs and has built several libraries, even having gotten several books published through state controlled media.

Fo Guang Shan Buddha Museum 

Building plans for the Fo Guang Shan Buddha Museum (formerly called the Buddha Memorial Center) started with support from the Taiwanese government. The museum's Jade Buddha Shrine is purported to hold tooth relics of the historic Buddha. The site is situated immediately adjacent to the main monastery and covers more than 100 hectares. The complex faces east and is built along a central axial line. Beyond the Welcoming Hall are eight Chinese-styled pagodas on either side of the main avenue leading up to the Bodhi Square, about which are statues of the Buddha's main disciples and of the founders of the principal schools of Chinese Buddhism. The path leads onto the Memorial Hall, which holds several shrines including the Jade Buddha Shrine. Above the hall are four stupas that symbolize the Four Noble Truths. Standing behind but separate from it, there is an enormous seated metal Shakyamuni Buddha 108 meters high. The Center was opened at an international ceremony on 25 December 2011 and the first anniversary celebrated on Christmas Day 2012.

Governance

Board of Directors 
In 1972, Hsing Yun established a nine-member council, known as the Fo Guang Shan Religious Affairs Committee, later renamed the Fo Guang Shan Board of Directors. These nine members govern and oversee the operations of the order through making appointments to various departments and other temples from within the order’s network. Each of the nine members are elected prior to the resignation, death, or the ending of a term of an abbot. Once elected by members of Fo Guang Shan, the votes are openly counted. The nine members then nominate their next abbot, who in practice was chosen by Hsing Yun personally. Eight members of the council are ordained monastics, and one is a non-voting layperson.

Abbots 
Unlike a traditional Mahayana Buddhist monastery, where the incumbent abbot usually selects his successor, Fo Guang Shan directly elects an abbot to head the Order and its temple branches worldwide. The head of the FGS order and all of its branches is the abbot and chief executive of Fo Guang Shan Monastery. The abbot is the chairperson of the Board of Directors, serving a term of six years, with one reappointment by popular vote and, under exceptional circumstances, a second reappointment by two-thirds vote. The abbot is elected by all monastic members of Fo Guang Shan through public vote. 

Per tradition, the abbot-elect then begins to use their "inner name", in place of his/her own dharma name, with the first character being Hsin ("心", xin, or heart). In fact, all monastics of Fo Guang Shan have such a name, and several Elders also use theirs publicly. At the beginning of the year, the abbot-elect is inaugurated as the new director of Fo Guang Shan through a traditional dharma transmission ceremony, receiving the robe, bowl, khakkhara, and a copy of the FGS constitution. In the case of Venerable Hsin Bau’s inauguration in 2013, he and 72 other monastics received dharma transmission from Hsing Yun along with him.

Hsing Yun is the only abbot to have served as such for more than two terms and was not elected by the board of directors. In the case of Venerable Hsin Ping, he was also not officially elected, as he was Hsing Yun's designated heir apparent. After Hsin Ping died of sudden illness in 1995, the vice director of Fo Guang Shan, Venerable Hsin Ting was immediately elevated to serve the remaining years of Hsin Ping's term before he was elected to a term in his own right. Abbots have been elected according to FGS's constitution since then.

As with Hsing Yun, emeritus abbots do not leave the order when they retire. They continue to make Dharma talks throughout the world and become elder teachers of the order in their later years.

Dharma propagation 

Dharma programs of Fo Guang Shan include lectures given in prisons and factories; programs on television, radio, and online, large-scale public lectures in Taiwan and overseas, and the five precepts initiation given twice a year at the monastery.

All branches of Fo Guang Shan organize pilgrimages to bring devotees to the monastery from different parts of Taiwan and overseas. Once pilgrims arrive, they are free to make use of all of the different activities that are open to the general public.

An exception is made in mainland China, as the order focuses strongly on cultural exchange rather than religion as a way to introduce Buddhist ideas, as proselytizing is illegal in China.

Fo Guang Shan's approach to Dharma propagation focuses on simplifying Buddhism in order to make it more appealing to the masses. The organization is known for utilizing modern marketing techniques and methods to preach such as the use of laser shows and multimedia displays. Fo Guang Shan temples have no entrance fee, and do not allow many of the practices commonly found in other Chinese temples, such as fortune-telling or the presence of sales vendors. Despite the popularity of the organization, Fo Guang Shan has received criticism for being "too focused on commercialism, expanding its membership base, and building large temples." (Schak and Hsiao)

Objectives 
 To propagate Buddhist teachings through cultural activities
 To foster talent through education
 To benefit society through charitable programs
 To purify human hearts and minds through Buddhist practice

Mottos

Official motto

The Four Verses of Fo Guang Shan and BLIA 
May kindness, compassion, joy, and equanimity pervade all worlds;
May we cherish and build affinities to benefit all beings;
May Chan, Pure Land, and Precepts inspire equality and patience;
May our humility and gratitude give rise to great vows.

BLIA guidelines 
 Offer others confidence
 Offer others joy
 Offer others hope
 Offer others convenience

Abbots and directors

Branches 

Fo Guang Shan Mabuhay Temple, Philippines
Zu Lai Temple, Cotia, Brazil
Chung Tian Temple, Queensland, Australia
Hsi Lai Temple, California, US
Nan Hua Temple, South Africa
Nan Tien Temple, Berkeley,  Australia
Fo Guang Shan Temple, Auckland, New Zealand
Fo Guang Shan Temple, Toronto, Canada
Guang Ming Temple, Central Florida, US
London Fo Guang Shan Temple, UK
Fo Guang Shan New York Temple. New York, US

See also 
 Buddhism in Taiwan
 Four Great Mountains (Taiwan)
 Four Heavenly Kings (Taiwan)
 Linji school
 Buddha's Light International Association
 Beautiful Life Television
 Fo Guang University
 University of the West

References

Bibliography 
 Chandler, Stuart (2002). Globalizing Chinese Culture, Localizing Buddhist Teachings: the Internationalization of Foguangshan, Journal of Global Buddhism 3, 46–78
 Chandler, Stuart (2004). Establishing a Pure Land on Earth: The Foguang Buddhist Perspective on Modernization and Globalization. Honolulu: University of Hawaii Press

External links 
 



 
Religious organizations established in 1967
Buddhist orders
Buddhist organizations based in Taiwan